Alicia Escardó Vegh (born 25 June 1963) is a Uruguayan writer, cultural manager, and multimedia e-learning content creator.

Biography
Alicia Escardó was born in Montevideo on 25 June 1963. She graduated from the University of the Republic's Faculty of Engineering with the title of computer analyst. From 2002 to 2008 she lived in Spain and studied at Pompeu Fabra University in Barcelona and the National University of Distance Education in Madrid.

She has participated in two collective books, published stories in magazines, and has received mentions and awards for her literary work.

Escardó has also organized several cultural events, including the Semana Negra Uy – recognized by the Ministry of Education and Culture (MEC) Cultural Incentive Funds – and the Cycle of Exhibitions of Juan Capagorry, a project which won an MEC Competitive Grant.

Works

 El poder invisible (Banda Oriental, 2011)
 La ventana de enfrente (Trilce, 2012)
 El chico que se sentaba en el rincón (Fin de Siglo, 2014)
 Nayla y el misterio XO (Fin de Siglo, 2015)
 Mavi, no te rindas (Quipu, 2017)
 Escape de los Balcanes, (co-author, Random House, 2018)
 La muerte de Pan (Fin de Siglo, 2019)

Collective books
 Cuentos de montaña errante (Fin de Siglo, 2017)
 25/40 Narradores de la Banda Oriental (Banda Oriental, 2018)

Crime fiction anthologies
 Semana negra.uy: Archivos confidenciales (Ediciones de la Plaza, 2019)

Awards and honors
 Posdata Magazine Novel Contest, Para llegar al final, 2000, mention
 Horacio Quiroga International Contest, book El poder invisible, 2011, first prize
 MEC Annual Literature Awards, juvenile literature, Niños como pájaros, 2013, mention
 Onetti Award, Intendency of Montevideo, youth literature, Mi pueblo ya no es el mismo, 2014, mention
 MEC Annual Literature Awards, youth literature, El chico que se sentaba en el rincón, 2014, second prize
 Narrators of the Banda Oriental National Narrative Award, Lolita Rubial Foundation, narrative, El naufragio, 2014, mention
 MEC Annual Literature Awards, youth literature, Nayla y el misterio XO, 2017, first prize

References

External links
 

1963 births
21st-century Uruguayan women writers
21st-century Uruguayan writers
Living people
University of the Republic (Uruguay) alumni
Uruguayan children's writers
Uruguayan engineers
Uruguayan women children's writers
Writers from Montevideo